Marmmaram is a 1982 Indian Malayalam-language film, directed by Bharathan. The film stars Nedumudi Venu, Bharath Gopi, Jalaja and KPAC Lalitha . The film has musical score by M. S. Viswanathan. The film won the Kerala State Film Awards including Best Lyrics for Kavalam Narayana Panikkar.

Plot
Narayana Iyer / Nanu is a Tamil Brahmin school headmaster who comes to a hill station school on transfer. He is accompanied by his mother and sister. Nanu starts to bring more discipline in to the wayward school and makes it more organized. He is smitten by the music teacher Nirmala and soon both fall in love with each other. Iyer brings home Nirmala and introduces her to the family, even going to the lengths of cancelling her transfer by influencing the DEO during his sister's marriage. He finally professes his love to her only for Nirmala to reveal that she's already married and has a son from that marriage who now lives with her father, and she visits in between. Her husband is a Naxalite on the run from police and he's on the run now for 4 years without any information. They had a family life close to 2 years only after which he took up arms and became an extremist. Nirmala doesn't know whether he is dead/alive or behind bars since there's a bounty on his head by the government. Iyer is confused for a while, but finally decides to marry her at his colleague Devan's advice. He brings home Nirmala who is hesitantly accepted by Nanu's mother. One day Nirmala receives a telegram informing that her son is ill and admitted to hospital. Nirmala takes a reluctant Iyer to the hospital to be with her son and Iyer eventually returns to school. He's upset when Nirmala is not yet back after a week. She finally arrives with her son to Iyer's house saying that she was late since the hospital discharged her son now only. Iyer's mother leaves home when he breaks the news to his mother that Nirmala has a kid out of first marriage. Iyer is upset at the turn of events, but eventually warms up to Nirmala's son. One night when they return from outside, they find that Nirmala's first husband Gopi has come to their house to see her and his son. Iyer lets him inside and asks Nirmala to serve him food. Gopi is on the run from police after a jail break and fears for his life. He leaves the house after food, telling both Iyer and Nirmala that he is happy at the turn of events. Just as he leaves their compound into the darkness, he is shot dead by the police. A helpless Nirmala breaks down and is consoled by Iyer.

Cast

Nedumudi Venu as Narayana Iyer
Bharath Gopi as Gopi, Nirmala's Husband 
Jalaja as Nirmala
KPAC Lalitha as Thressayamma
Jose as Devan
Aroor Sathyan
Lalithasree as Mrs. Sheshadri
Master Anoop
Meena as Narayana Iyer's Mother 
Prathima
Sairabhanu
Vanchiyoor Radha
Savithri

Soundtrack
The music was composed by M. S. Viswanathan and the lyrics were written by Kavalam Narayana Panicker.

References

External links
 

1982 films
Films directed by Bharathan
1980s Malayalam-language films
1980s romance films
Films scored by M. S. Viswanathan
Indian romance films